Mohaddipur is a small village approximately 25 km from Biharsharif town in the State of Bihar. The village has a population of approximately 3000 as per 2021 census of the Government of India.

HOW TO REACH

The village can be reached by taking a taxi from Biharsharif town or public transport such as a bus.

Villages in Saran district